Philip DeSimone (born 19 March 1987) is an American former professional ice hockey center.

Playing career
Prior to attending the University of New Hampshire,  DeSimone played three seasons (2004–07) with the Sioux City Musketeers of the USHL. DeSimone was selected by Washington Capitals in the 3rd round (84th overall) of the 2007 NHL Entry Draft.

DeSimone made his professional debut in the 2011–12 season, after signing a one-year contract with the Hamilton Bulldogs of the AHL. After producing an impressive 33 points in his rookie season, DeSimone was signed by fellow AHL club, the Albany Devils, on a one-year contract on July 6, 2012.

After forging his first European season in the Finnish Liiga with Jokerit and the Swedish HockeyAllsvenskan with Södertälje SK and briefly Björklöven IF, DeSimone opted to sign a one-year contract with Champions Hockey League bound HC Bolzano of the EBEL for the 2014–15 season, on August 19, 2014. DeSimone played upon the scoring lines with Bolzano to contribute with 36 points in 49 games.

On June 29, 2015, DeSimone opted to remain in the Austrian League, leaving Bolzano in signing a one-year contract with fellow competitors Graz 99ers. In the 2015–16 season, DeSimone played on the top scoring line of the 99ers, contributing with 9 goals and 22 points in 39 games before opting to end his contract mid-season. He returned to North America, signing for the remainder of the year with AHL club, the Lehigh Valley Phantoms on January 22, 2016.

On October 26, 2016, DeSimone signed a Professional Tryout Contract with the Utica Comets. After playing 15 games with the HC La Chaux-de-Fonds during the 2016–17 season, DeSimone finished his career with senior men's club, the Stoney Creek Generals in the Allan Cup Hockey league.

Personal life
DeSimone's younger brother Nick is a member of the Calgary Flames organization.

Career statistics

Awards and honors

References

External links

1987 births
Living people
Albany Devils players
American men's ice hockey centers
IF Björklöven players
Bolzano HC players
HC La Chaux-de-Fonds players
Graz 99ers players
Ice hockey players from New York (state)
Hamilton Bulldogs (AHL) players
Jokerit players
Lehigh Valley Phantoms players
New Hampshire Wildcats men's ice hockey players
People from East Amherst, New York
Sioux City Musketeers players
Södertälje SK players
Trenton Titans players
Utica Comets players
Washington Capitals draft picks